James Alexander Shedden-Goonewardene (1921–1997) was a Sri Lankan writer. He was born in Pannala, Sri-Lanka, and was raised in Matara, Sri Lanka. He was the son of Mabel Alice Goonewardene and James Robert Shedden, a police inspector serving in the remote town of Pannala, Sri-Lanka. After his birth the family moved to Matara, Sri-Lanka, where they spent several years before moving to Harmer's Avenue in Wellawatte, Colombo. He studied at the University of London. During the 1950s, he began writing stories while working as a school teacher. In 1963, he became a broadcaster for Radio Ceylon while writing skits and dramas for the Sri Lanka Broadcasting Corporation. 

James' first novel A Quiet Place was published in 1968, followed by Call of the Kirala in 1971. In 1978, he left broadcasting to devote himself full-time to writing. He published more English language novels than any other Sri-Lankan author. His work suffered some heavy criticism because English was becoming marginalized in the nationalistic passion in Sri-Lanka during the 1960s and the 1971 JVP Insurrection. He was the first Sri-Lankan author to have a novel published by Penguin India and has received retroactive acclaim.

James was married to an Australian national named Sonia. He had no children and died in 1997.

Bibliography
 The Tribal Hangover (1995)
 One Mad Bid for Freedon (1990)
 An Asian Gambit (1985)
 Dream Time River (1984)
 Acid Bomb Explosion (1978)
 The Awakening of Doctor Kirthi and Other Stories (1976)
 Call of the Kirala (1978)
 A Quiet Place: A man's quest in a village by the jungle (1968)

References

External links
 
 

1921 births
1997 deaths
Sinhalese writers
Sri Lankan people of British descent
Sri Lankan expatriates in the United Kingdom